Comparative education is a discipline in the social sciences which entails the scrutiny and evaluation of different educational systems, such as those in various countries. Professionals in this area of endeavor are absorbed in advancing evocative terminologies and guidelines for education worldwide, enhancing educational structures and producing a context to which the success and effectivity of education programs and initiatives can be assessed.

Objectives 
According to Harold Noah (1985), and Farooq Joubish (2009), comparative education has five purposes:
To describe educational systems, processes, or outcomes.
To assist in the development of educational institutions and practices.
To highlight the relationships between education and society.
To establish generalized statements about education that are valid in more than one country.
To help the current generation understand the nowadays education systems with reference to the past.
Comparative education is often incorrectly assumed to exclusively encompass studies that compare two or more different countries. In fact, since its early days researchers in this field have often eschewed such approaches, preferring rather to focus on comparisons within a single country over time. Still, some large scale projects, such as the PISA and TIMSS studies, have made important findings through explicitly comparative macro analysis of massive data sets.

Rationale for the Field 
Many important educational questions can best be examined from an international and comparative perspective. For example, in the United States there is no nationwide certificate of completion of secondary education. This raises the hypothetical question of what may be the advantages and disadvantages of leaving such certification to each of the 50 states. Comparative education may draw on the experience of countries such as Japan and France, for instance, to show how a centralized system works, and illustrate the possible advantages and disadvantages of a more centralized approach to educational certification. Critics of comparative education sometimes disparagingly refer to its approaches and conclusions as "policy borrowing," with the implication that policies are best developed organically according to local needs rather than what appears to have worked in other contexts. However, comparative education scholars argue that education everywhere faces many of the same challenges, and there is much to learn from both successes and failures in other contexts.

Disciplinary vs. Interdisciplinary Identity 
Comparative education is closely related to, and may overlap with, international education, international development education, and comparative sociology. There are also efforts to expand and "decolonize," the field of philosophy of education with a comparative education approach. While in some countries, comparative education is fully established as a distinct field of educational research, in others it might best be regarded as an interdisciplinary field that brings together scholars from diverse specializations. For instance, specialists in math education, social studies education, or various arts subjects may develop research designed to enable meaningful comparisons between national educational systems with a focus on their specific subject area of expertise. It follows that comparative education research can examine schooling holistically and globally (macro-level analysis), or may alternatively focus on the status of a particular subject area in a specific region of the world, thereby benefiting from subject-area or regional expertise (meso- or micro-level analysis). Each approach may have characteristic advantages and disadvantages.

Comparative and International Education Society 
The Comparative and International Education Society (CIES) was founded in 1956 to foster "cross-cultural understanding, scholarship, academic achievement, and societal development through the international study of educational ideas, systems, and practices."

Comparative Education Society of India 
The Comparative Education Society of India (CESI) was established in 1979 and admitted to the World Council of Comparative Education Societies (WCCES) in 1980. The annual conferences of CESI bring together Education Researchers from across the country to present papers on different topics connected to the theme of the conference.

See also
UNESCO-IBE
World Council for Comparative Education Societies
International Society for Comparative Adult Education
Comparative Education Review
Comparative research
A Comparative Analysis of the Histories of Different Countries' Education Systems

Influential Scholars 
Andreas Kazamias
Mark Bray
Nicholas Burbules
Torsten Husen
John W. Meyer
Harold J. Noah
Fernando Reimers
Carlos Torres

Further reading

Major Reference Handbooks 
Educational Research, Methodology and Measurement: An International Handbook. 2nd ed. Edited by J.P. Keeves. New York: Pergamon, 1997.
International Handbook of Research in Arts Education. Edited by Liora Bresler. New York: Springer, 2006.
International Encyclopedia of Adult Education and Training. 2nd ed. Edited by Albert C. Tuijnman. Oxford, UK; Tarrytown, NY: Pergamon, 1996. 
International Encyclopedia of National Systems of Education. 2nd ed. Edited by T. Neville Postlethwaite. Tarrytown, NY: Pergamon, 1995.
International Companion to Education, Edited by Moon, B. Ben-Peretz, M & Brown S. London & NY: Routledge, 2000.
International Handbook of Educational Change. Edited by Andy Hargreaves, et al. Boston,: Kluwer Academic Publishers, 1998.
International Handbook of Educational Leadership and Administration. Edited by Kenneth Leithwood, et al. Boston: Kluwer Academic, 1996.
International Handbook of Teachers and Teaching. Edited by Bruce J. Biddle, Thomas L. Good, Ivor F. Goodson. Boston,: Kluwer Academic Publishers, 1998. 
International Handbook of Women's Education. Edited by Gail P. Kelly. New York: Greenwood Press, 1989.

Other Resources 
Altbach, Philip G. Comparative Higher Education: Knowledge, the University, and Development. Greenwich, CT: Ablex Pub. Corp., 1998.
Comparative Education Research Approaches and Methods. Edited by Mark Bray, Bob Adamson and Mark Mason. Hong Kong and Dordrecht: Springer, 2007.
Emergent Issues in Education: Comparative Perspectives. Edited by Robert F. Arnove, Philip G. Altbach, and Gail P. Kelly. Albany, NY: State University of New York Press, 1992. 
Arnove, R. and Torres, C. eds (1999) Comparative Education: The Dialectic of the Global and the Local. Oxford: Rowman and Littlefield.
International Perspectives on Educational Reform and Policy Implementation. Edited by David S.G. Carter and Marnie H. O'Neill. Washington, DC: Falmer Press, 1995. 
Quality Assurance in Higher Education: An International Perspective. Edited by Gerald H. Gaither. San Francisco: Jossey-Bass Publishers, 1998. 
Higher Education Policy: An International Comparative Perspective. Edited by Leo Goedegebuure, et al. New York: Pergamon Press, 1994.
Harold J. Noah and Max A. Eckstein. Toward a Science of Comparative Education (New York: Macmillan, 1969). 
Harold J. Noah and Max A. Eckstein. Secondary School Examinations: International Perspectives on Policies and Practice (New Haven: Yale University Press, 1993).  . 
Harold J. Noah and Max A. Eckstein. Doing Comparative Education: Three Decades of Collaboration (Hong Kong: The University of Hong Kong Press, 1998).  
Hebert, David & Hauge, Torunn Bakken. Advancing Music Education in Northern Europe (London: Routledge, 2019).
Gottlieb, Esther E.  Are We Postmodern Yet? Historical and Theoretical Explorations in Comparative Education. In Moon, B. Ben-Peretz, M & Brown S., (eds.)  International Companion to Education, pp. 153–175 London & NY: Routledge, 2000.
 Mazawi, A.E. & Sultana, R.G. (eds)(2010). Education and the Arab 'World'. Political Project, Struggles, and Geometries of Power. (New York: Routledge). 
Reagan, Timothy G. Non-Western Educational Traditions : Alternative Approaches to Educational Thought and Practice. Mahwah, NJ: L. Erlbaum Associates, 1996. 
 Schriewer, Jürgen (2000). "Comparative Education Methodology in Transition: Towards the Study of Complexity?" pp. 3–52. In Schreiwer, Jürgen (Ed.) Discourse Formation in Comparative Education. Frankfurt am Main: Peter Lang.
Vulliamy, G., Lewin, K. and Stephens, D. (1990) Doing Educational Research in Developing Countries: Qualitative Strategies. Lewes: Falmer Press.
Higher Education in an International Perspective : Critical Issues. Edited by Zaghloul Morsy and Philip G. Altbach. New York: Garland Pub., 1996.

References

External links 

World Council of Comparative Education Societies
Comparative and International Education: A Bibliography (2004)
NCCRESt Bibliography (2000)
Comparative and International Education Society (CIES)
Comparative Education Society of India (CESI)

 
Education by subject
Philosophy of education